Nick Dodge (born 1 May 1986) is a Canadian former professional ice hockey right wing. He was drafted by the Carolina Hurricanes in the  6th round (183rd overall) of the 2006 NHL Entry Draft.

Playing career
Born in Oakville, Ontario, Dodge played junior hockey with the Oakville Blades in the OPJHL before playing four years (2004–08) of ECAC college hockey with the Clarkson Golden Knights team at Clarkson University.

Dodge turned professional for the 2008–09 season, suiting up for the Hurricanes' AHL affiliate, the Albany River Rats. Dodge played out his three-year entry-level contract within the Hurricanes AHL affiliates, in the River Rats and the Charlotte Checkers, before retiring from professional hockey having played in 217 AHL games.

Career statistics

Awards and honours

References

External links

1986 births
Living people
Albany River Rats players
Canadian ice hockey right wingers
Carolina Hurricanes draft picks
Charlotte Checkers (2010–) players
Clarkson Golden Knights men's ice hockey players
Ice hockey people from Ontario
Sportspeople from Oakville, Ontario
AHCA Division I men's ice hockey All-Americans